Jahangir Harun SGP, ndc, afwc, psc is a retired major general in the Bangladesh Army.  He was GOC of  33rd Infantry Division & Area Commander, Cumilla Area. Prior to join there, he served as Commandant of Bangladesh Institute of Peace Support Operation Training (BIPSOT).

Career 
He was Commission with 20th BMA Long Course on 23 June 1989. Harun served as Commander of PGR when he was Brigadier General. During Corona Pandemic he played a pivotal role to control to raise awareness about coronavirus. Under his supervision, 33 Infantry Division celebrated Armed Forces day by awarded one thousand freedom fighters and their families. He also serves at Chairman of Governing body including Mainamati Golf and Country Club.

References 

Bangladesh Army generals
Bangladeshi military personnel
Living people
1966 births